Rumsey is an unincorporated community and census-designated place (CDP) in Yolo County, California. Rumsey's ZIP Code is 95679 and its area code 530. It lies at an elevation of 420 feet (128 m).

History
A post office was erected in 1878 near the Rumsey community, but it was named "Rock". In 1888 it was moved two miles north to the terminus of the Vaca Valley and Clear Lake Railroad, and the name was changed to "Rumsey". The name "Rock" was after a rock landmark, and the name "Rumsey" was given after Captain D.C. Rumsey who owned the land at the time.

Cache Creek was temporarily blocked north of Rumsey by a landslide caused by the 1906 San Francisco earthquake: "Our Rumsey correspondent mentions the fall of Cache Creek as a result of an earthquake shock Tuesday night. The water has continued to fall some since that date and in some places it is dry. Upon investigation by the officials of the Water Company it was found that a landslide had dammed the Creek near the Leonard ranch in Lake county...."  The creek subsequently broke through, causing severe flooding in Rumsey.

References

External links

Census-designated places in California
Census-designated places in Yolo County, California
Unincorporated communities in the Sacramento metropolitan area